The JazzMN Orchestra is a 17-piece jazz ensemble and non-profit organization based in Minneapolis–Saint Paul with a mission to produce excellence and in the jazz art form through concerts and educational practices and in the process try to revitalize America's understanding of jazz. Its outreach program gives local students the opportunity to learn from and play alongside its musicians in concert. In order to this, JazzMN performs at several music festivals each year including the McNally Smith Winter Jazz Blast located at the McNally Smith College of Music.

Band members
The majority of its members have a background in music education.
Doug Snapp – Artistic Director

Saxophone
Pete Whitman – alto saxophone 
Mike Walk – alto saxophone 
Dave Karr -tenor saxophone 
David Milne – tenor saxophone 
Kathy Jensen – baritone saxophone

Trumpet
Bob Halgrimson
Jeff Gottwig 
Adam Rossmiller 
Dave Jensen

Trombone
Michael B. Nelson
Dave Graf
Ethan Freier
Wade Clark – bass trombone

Rhythm section
Mary Louise Knutson – piano
Chris Olson – guitar
Terry Burns – bass
Joe Pulice – drums
Rey Rivera – percussion

Guest vocalist
Connie Evingson

Featured artists
In addition to performing at festivals, JazzMN presents a concert series each year. The series consists of four shows, each with a different jazz theme or featured artist.  In addition to the regular members of the band, the group has featured artists such as Randy Brecker, Arturo Sandoval, Gordon Goodwin, Wayne Bergeron, Phil Hey, and Eric Marienthal. It has performed at The Artists Quarter and the Dakota Jazz Club.

Discography
 "JazzMN Big Band featuring Buddy DeFranco, Dave Weckl, and Irv Williams" (2000)
 "Enriching Life with Jazz" (2011)

References

External links
JazzMN.org Official site

American jazz ensembles from Minnesota
Musical groups established in 1999
1999 establishments in Minnesota